Sigma, officially the Municipality of Sigma (Capiznon/Hiligaynon: Banwa sang Sigma), is a 4th class municipality in the province of Capiz, Philippines. According to the 2020 census, it has a population of 31,688 people.

It was named after the legendary Datu Sikma, which was corrupted by the Spaniards into Sigma, as they have difficulty in pronouncing the letter "k".

Geography

Barangays
Sigma is politically subdivided into 21 barangays.

Climate

Demographics

Economy

References

External links
 [ Philippine Standard Geographic Code]
Philippine Census Information

Municipalities of Capiz